On the Edge is the second album by a trance musician Andy Duguid.

Songs
"On The Edge" - 6:53
"Skin & Bones" feat. Julie Thompson -  6:19
"When You're With Me" feat. Hannah Ray - 6:57
"Paradise (Richard's Theme)" - 6:07
"Hurt" feat. Seri - 6:25
"I Want To Believe" feat. Shannon Hurley - 7:13
"Percussion Man" - 7:24
"In This Moment" feat. Audrey Gallagher - 7:16
"Tiago" - 7:09
"Stars" feat. Steven Taetz - - 6:23
"Music Box" feat. Lizzie Curious - 8:01
"7Even" feat. Jaren - 7:33

References

2013 albums
Trance albums